Eusebiu is a Romanian male given name that may refer to:
  (1910–1965), Romanian writer
 Eusebiu Diaconu (born 1981), Romanian Greco-Roman wrestler
  (1838–1922), Romanian author
 Eusebiu Ștefănescu (1944–2015), Romanian actor
 Eusebiu Tudor (born 1974), Romanian football midfielder manager

Romanian masculine given names